Concord, Missouri is a census-designated place in St. Louis County.

Concord, Missouri may also refer to:

Concord, Callaway County, Missouri, an unincorporated community
Concord, Pemiscot County, Missouri, an unincorporated community

See also 
Concord (disambiguation)